Charles William Porter (born January 12, 1956), is an American former professional baseball player, a pitcher in Major League Baseball (MLB) from 1981 to 1985 for the Milwaukee Brewers.  Prior to turning professional, Porter played for the Clemson Tigers, where he was named ACC Player of the Year in 1976.

Porter is notable for giving up the home run that ended the longest game in MLB history on May 9, 1984. It was hit by Harold Baines of the Chicago White Sox.

External links

1956 births
Living people
American expatriate baseball players in Canada
Baseball players from Baltimore
Burlington Bees players
Beloit Brewers players
Clemson Tigers baseball players
El Paso Diablos players
Holyoke Millers players
Major League Baseball pitchers
Milwaukee Brewers players
Quad Cities Angels players
Salinas Angels players
Salt Lake City Gulls players
Vancouver Canadians players